Bogandé is a town located in the province of Gnagna in Burkina Faso. It is the capital of Bogandé Department and Gnagna Province. The town has a population of 21,443 (2019).

Transport 
Bogandé Airport (IATA: XBG, ICAO: DFEB) is a public use airport located near Bogandé, Gnagna, Burkina Faso.

References

Populated places in the Est Region (Burkina Faso)